Orxan Abbasov, better known by his stage name Orxan Qarabasma and OGB, is an Azerbaijani rapper, songwriter.

Biography 
Orxan Abbasov was born on October 18, 1987, in Baku. He graduated from Azerbaijan State University of Culture and Arts. In 2006 he founded hip hop band named "Qarabasma". In 2009 Orxan started his solo career.

In 2015 he founded "AFTERMAD" label with rapper RG.

He is co-founder of "Kəllə-Kəlləyə", famous rap battle in Azerbaijan.

Orxan Qarabasma is also songwriter. His song's became very popular in Azerbaijan music industry. His tracks such as “Ad günü” has 11 million, “Tərki-Dünya” has 10 million, “Hərdən” has 6 million, “Oyna” has 5 million, “Çətin” has 2.5 million views on Youtube.

Discography

Singles

As a songwriter 
 Miri Yusif - Ad günü (2016) 
 Natavan Həbibi - Dəyməz (2017) 
 Samra Rahimli - Tərs gedir (2017) 
 Miri Yusif & Röya - Yaxşı ki varsan (2017) 
 Natavan Həbibi - Qayıt geri (2017) 
 Miri Yusif - Tərki-dünya (2017) 
 Jeyhun Zeynalov & Rauf Ahmedov - Birinci ol (2017) 
 Miri Yusif - Oyna (2017) 
 Kazim Can - Dağıdaram (2018)
 Kazim Can - Mənimlə (2018)
 Sevda Alekperzadeh - İstəmirəm (2019) 
 Emil Badalov - Tony Montana (2019)
 Kazim Can - Ömrüm (2019)
 Yashar Yusub - Kimdir (2020)
 Narmin Karimbayova - Yana-yana (2020)
 Kazim Can - Fevral (2020)
 Aygün Kazımova - Dəli fikirlər (2020) 
 Murad Arif & Elşad Xose - Get iş tap işlə (2020) 
 Kazim Can & Natavan Həbibi - Dost (2021)
 Natavan Habibi - Çətin (2021) 
 Faig Aghayev - Aman (2021)

Albums 
 Mini (2017) 
 Qara qutu (2019)

References

External links
 
 Orxan Qarabasma on Spotify

1987 births
Living people
Azerbaijani rappers
21st-century Azerbaijani male singers